Quinty Regina Trustfull-van den Broek  is a Dutch actress, television presenter and former model.

Career 
Trustfull began modeling in 1993 and simultaneously began working as a television and radio presenter at Veronica Broadcasting Organization. In 1995 she received her first role as a presenter for the Dutch national Lottery show Nationale Teleloterij. She has since continued her work presenting numerous popular dutch television program. Some of her most notable work came from her work in Eigen Huis & Tuin a Dutch home improvement show and the Dancing on Ice Dutch franchise.

In 2014 she starred in the Dutch television film Assepoester: een modern sprookje.

Personal life 
In 1994 she married footballer Orlando Trustfull and the couple have three children; Mose born 1994, Moïse born 1995 and Kayne born 1998.

Filmography

References

External links 
 

Year of birth missing (living people)
Living people
Dutch female models
Dutch actresses
Dutch television presenters
Mass media people from Amsterdam
Models from Amsterdam